The 2014–15 Notre Dame Fighting Irish men's basketball team represented the University of Notre Dame during the 2014–15 NCAA Division I men's basketball season. The Fighting Irish, led by fifteenth year head coach Mike Brey, played its home games at the Purcell Pavilion at the Joyce Center in South Bend, Indiana and were second year members of the Atlantic Coast Conference. They finished the season 32–6, 14–4 in ACC play to finish in third place. They defeated Miami (FL), Duke, and North Carolina to become champions of the ACC tournament. They received an automatic bid to the NCAA tournament where they defeated Northeastern in the second round, Butler in the third round, and Wichita State in the Sweet Sixteen before losing in the Elite Eight to unbeaten Kentucky in a close game, 68–66.

Previous season
The Fighting Irish finished the 2012–13 season 25–10, with an 11–7 record in Big East play. They then finished the 2013-14 season at 15–17, 6–12 in ACC play to finish in a three-way tie for 11th place. In their first year as ACC members, they lost in the first round of the ACC tournament to Wake Forrest.

Departures

Class of 2014 signees

Roster

Schedule and results

|-
!colspan=12 style="background:#002649; color:white;"| Exhibition

|-
!colspan=12 style="background:#002649; color:white;"| Regular season

|-
!colspan=12 style="background:#002649; color:white;"| ACC Tournament

|-
!colspan=12 style="background:#002649; color:white;"| NCAA tournament

Rankings

References

Notre Dame Fighting Irish men's basketball seasons
Notre Dame
Notre Dame
Fight
Fight